Robert Åstedt (born 2 February 1996) is a Swedish retired footballer and current assistant manager of AFC Eskilstuna.

Career

Later career
In May 2021 AFC Eskilstuna confirmed, that 25-year old had retired and would continue as a part of the technical staff as an individual coach. Beside that, he would also continue in his position as a youth coach, which he had been since 2017, after AFC United changed their name to AFC Eskilstuna.

On 7 November 2021, Åstedt made his comeback on the pitch after most of the players in AFC Eskilstuna's squad suffered from stomach ailments. Åstedt came on the pitch from the bench in a 4-3 win against Falkenbergs FF.

References

Living people
1996 births
Association football defenders
Swedish footballers
AFC Eskilstuna players
Allsvenskan players
Superettan players